Larry Hal Grinde (born June 25, 1948) is an American politician and rancher who served in the Montana House of Representatives from 1986 to 2000 as a Republican. Grinde served as Minority Whip from 1991 to 1992 and House Majority Leader from 1993 to 2000.

Early life and education
Grinde was born in Lewistown, Montana on June 25, 1948. He attended the University of Wyoming and Montana State University.

Career
Grinde served in the Montana House of Representatives from 1986 to 2000 as a Republican. He served as Minority Whip from 1991 to 1992 and House Majority Leader from 1993 to 2000.

Grinde was an unsuccessful candidate to represent the 47th legislative district of Montana in the Montana Senate in 2000.

Outside of the Montana Legislature, Grinde served as a chair of the Fergus County Republican Central Committee.

Outside of politics, Grinde worked as a rancher.

Political positions
In 1998, Grinde received a 100% rating from Gun Owners of America and a B rating from the National Rifle Association. In 1999, he received a 100% rating from the National Federation of Independent Business.

Personal life
Grinde resides in Lewiston. He is divorced and has two children.

Grinde is a Lutheran.

References

External links
Profile from Vote Smart

1948 births
Living people
21st-century American politicians
20th-century American politicians
Republican Party members of the Montana House of Representatives
Ranchers from Montana
Montana State University alumni
University of Wyoming alumni
People from Lewistown, Montana